Andilamena District is a district in the Alaotra-Mangoro region in Madagascar. Its capital is Andilamena.

Communes
The district is further divided into eight communes:

 Andilamena
 Antanimenabaka
 Bemaitso
 Maintsokely
 Maroadabo
 Marovato
 Miarinarivo
 Tanananifololahy

References

Districts of Alaotra-Mangoro